The men's 3000 metres steeplechase event at the 2004 African Championships in Athletics was held in Brazzaville, Republic of the Congo on July 14.

Results

References
Results

2004 African Championships in Athletics
Steeplechase at the African Championships in Athletics